Yin and yang ( and ) is a Chinese philosophical concept that describes opposite but interconnected forces. In Chinese cosmology, the universe creates itself out of a primary chaos of material energy, organized into the cycles of yin and yang and formed into objects and lives. Yin is the receptive and yang the active principle, seen in all forms of change and difference such as the annual cycle (winter and summer), the landscape (north-facing shade and south-facing brightness), sexual coupling (female and male), the formation of both men and women as characters and sociopolitical history (disorder and order).

Taiji or tai chi is a Chinese cosmological term for the "Supreme Ultimate" state of undifferentiated absolute and infinite potential, the oneness before duality, from which yin and yang originate. It can be compared with the old wuji ("without pole"). In the cosmology pertaining to yin and yang, the material energy which this universe was created from is known as qi. It is believed that the organization of qi in this cosmology of yin and yang has formed many things. Included among these forms are humans. Many natural dualities (such as light and dark, fire and water, expanding and contracting) are thought of as physical manifestations of the duality symbolized by yin and yang. This duality lies at the origins of many branches of classical Chinese science and philosophy, as well as being a primary guideline of traditional Chinese medicine, and a central principle of different forms of Chinese martial arts and exercise, such as baguazhang, taijiquan (tai chi ch'üan) and qigong (ch'i kung), as well as appearing in the pages of the I Ching.

The notion of duality can be found in many areas, such as Communities of Practice. The term "dualistic-monism" or dialectical monism has been coined in an attempt to express this fruitful paradox of simultaneous unity and duality. Yin and yang can be thought of as complementary (rather than opposing) forces that interact to form a dynamic system in which the whole is greater than the assembled parts. According to this philosophy, everything has both yin and yang aspects (for instance, shadow cannot exist without light).  Either of the two major aspects may manifest more strongly in a particular object, depending on the criterion of the observation. The yin yang (i.e. taijitu symbol) shows a balance between two opposites with a portion of the opposite element in each section.

In Taoist metaphysics, distinctions between good and bad, along with other dichotomous moral judgments, are perceptual, not real; so, the duality of yin and yang is an indivisible whole. In the ethics of Confucianism on the other hand, most notably in the philosophy of Dong Zhongshu ( 2nd century BC), a moral dimension is attached to the idea of yin and yang.

Linguistic aspects 
These Chinese terms yīn  "dark side" and yáng  "white side" are linguistically analyzable in terms of Chinese characters, pronunciations and etymology, meanings, topography, and loanwords.

Characters

In the latter, yáng  "bright" features  "sun" +  +  "The rays of the sun".

Pronunciations and etymologies

Sinologists and historical linguists have reconstructed Middle Chinese pronunciations from data in the (7th century CE) Qieyun rhyme dictionary and later rhyme tables, which was subsequently used to reconstruct Old Chinese phonology from rhymes in the (11th–7th centuries BCE) Shijing and phonological components of Chinese characters. Reconstructions of Old Chinese have illuminated the etymology of modern Chinese words.

Compare these Middle Chinese and Old Chinese (with asterisk) reconstructions of yīn  and yáng :
 ˑiəm < *ˑiəm and iang < *diang (Bernhard Karlgren)
 ʔjəm and *raŋ (Li Fang-Kuei)
 ʔ(r)jum and *ljang (William H. Baxter)
 ʔjəm < *ʔəm and jiaŋ < *laŋ (Axel Schuessler)
 im < *qrum and yang < *laŋ (William H. Baxter and Laurent Sagart)

Schuessler gives probable Sino-Tibetan etymologies for both Chinese words.Yin < *ʔəm compares with Burmese ʔumC "overcast; cloudy", Adi muk-jum "shade", and Lepcha so'yǔm "shade"; and is probably cognate with Chinese àn < *ʔə̂mʔ  "dim; gloomy" and qīn < *khəm  "blanket".Yang < *laŋ compares with Lepcha a-lóŋ "reflecting light", Burmese laŋB "be bright" and ə-laŋB "light"; and is perhaps cognate with Chinese chāng < *k-hlaŋ  "prosperous; bright" (compare areal words like Tai plaŋA1 "bright" & Proto-Viet-Muong hlaŋB). To this word-family, Unger (Hao-ku, 1986:34) also includes  bǐng < *pl(j)aŋʔ "bright"; however Schuessler reconstructs  bǐngs Old Chinese pronunciation as *braŋʔ and includes it in an Austroasiatic word family, besides  liàng < *raŋh  shuǎng < *sraŋʔ "twilight (of dawn)"; míng < *mraŋ  "bright, become light, enlighten"; owing to "the different OC initial consonant which seems to have no recognizable OC morphological function".

Meanings
Yin and yang are semantically complex words.

John DeFrancis's ABC Chinese-English Comprehensive Dictionary gives the following translation equivalents.
Yin 陰 or 阴 — Noun: ① [philosophy] female/passive/negative principle in nature, ② Surname; Bound morpheme: ① the moon, ② shaded orientation, ③ covert; concealed; hidden, ④ vagina, ⑤ penis, ⑥ of the netherworld, ⑦ negative, ⑧ north side of a hill, ⑨ south bank of a river, ⑩ reverse side of a stele, ⑪ in intaglio; Stative verb: ① overcast, ② sinister; treacherous
Yang 陽 or 阳 — Bound morpheme: ① [Chinese philosophy] male/active/positive principle in nature, ② the sun, ③ male genitals, ④ in relief, ⑤ open; overt, ⑥ belonging to this world, ⑦ [linguistics] masculine, ⑧ south side of a hill, ⑨ north bank of a river

The compound yinyang  means "yin and yang; opposites; ancient Chinese astronomy; occult arts; astrologer; geomancer; etc."

The sinologist Rolf Stein etymologically translates Chinese yin  "shady side (of a mountain)" and yang  "sunny side (of a mountain)" with the uncommon English geographic terms ubac "shady side of a mountain" and adret "sunny side of a mountain" (which are of French origin).

Toponymy
Many Chinese place names or toponyms contain the word yang "sunny side" and a few contain yin "shady side". In China, as elsewhere in the Northern Hemisphere, sunlight comes predominantly from the south, and thus the south face of a mountain or the north bank of a river will receive more direct sunlight than the opposite side.

Yang refers to the "south side of a hill" in Hengyang , which is south of Mount Heng  in Hunan province, and to the "north bank of a river" in Luoyang , which is located north of the Luo River  in Henan.

Similarly, yin refers to "north side of a hill" in Huayin , which is north of Mount Hua  in Shaanxi province.

In Japan, the characters are used in western Honshu to delineate the north-side San'in region  from the south-side San'yō region , separated by the Chūgoku Mountains .

Loanwords
English yin, yang, and yin-yang are familiar loanwords of Chinese origin.

The Oxford English Dictionary defines:
yin (jɪn) Also Yin, Yn. [Chinese yīn shade, feminine; the moon.]
a. In Chinese philosophy, the feminine or negative principle (characterized by dark, wetness, cold, passivity, disintegration, etc.) of the two opposing cosmic forces into which creative energy divides and whose fusion in physical matter brings the phenomenal world into being. Also attrib. or as adj., and transf. Cf. yang.
b. Comb., as yin-yang, the combination or fusion of the two cosmic forces; freq. attrib., esp. as yin-yang symbol, a circle divided by an S-shaped line into a dark and a light segment, representing respectively yin and yang, each containing a 'seed' of the other. 
yang (jæŋ) Also Yang. [Chinese yáng yang, sun, positive, male genitals.]
a. In Chinese philosophy, the masculine or positive principle (characterized by light, warmth, dryness, activity, etc.) of the two opposing cosmic forces into which creative energy divides and whose fusion in physical matter brings the phenomenal world into being. Also attrib. or as adj. Cf. yin.
b. Comb.: yang-yin = yin-yang s.v. yin b.

For the earliest recorded "yin and yang" usages, the OED cites 1671 for yin and yang, 1850 for yin-yang, and 1959 for yang-yin.

In English, yang-yin (like ying-yang) occasionally occurs as a mistake or typographical error for the Chinese loanword yin-yang— yet they are not equivalents. "foreign silver") "silver coin/dollar", but not even the most comprehensive dictionaries (e.g., the Hanyu Da Cidian) enter yangyin *. While yang and yin can occur together in context, yangyin is not synonymous with yinyang. The linguistic term "irreversible binomial" refers to a collocation of two words A–B that cannot be idiomatically reversed as B–A, for example, English cat and mouse (not *mouse and cat) and friend or foe (not *foe or friend).

Similarly, the usual pattern among Chinese binomial compounds is for positive A and negative B, where the A word is dominant or privileged over B. For example, tiandi  "heaven and earth" and nannü  "men and women". Yinyang meaning "dark and light; female and male; moon and sun", is an exception. Scholars have proposed various explanations for why yinyang violates this pattern, including "linguistic convenience" (it is easier to say yinyang than yangyin), the idea that "proto-Chinese society was matriarchal", or perhaps, since yinyang first became prominent during the late Warring States period, this term was "purposely directed at challenging persistent cultural assumptions".

History
Joseph Needham discusses yin and yang together with Five Elements as part of the School of Naturalists. He says that it would be proper to begin with yin and yang before Five Elements because the former: "lay, as it were, at a deeper level in Nature, and were the most ultimate principles of which the ancient Chinese could conceive. But it so happens that we know a good deal more about the historical origin of the Five-Element theory than about that of the yin and the yang, and it will therefore be more convenient to deal with it first."

He then discusses Zou Yan (305–240 BC) who is most associated with these theories. Although yin and yang are not mentioned in any of the surviving documents of Zou Yan, his school was known as the Yin Yang Jia (Yin and Yang School). Needham concludes "There can be very little doubt that the philosophical use of the terms began about the beginning of the 4th century, and that the passages in older texts which mention this use are interpolations made later than that time."

Nature
Yin and yang is a concept originated in ancient Chinese philosophy that describes how obviously opposite or contrary forces may actually be complementary, interconnected, and interdependent in the natural world, and how they may give rise to each other as they interrelate to one another.

In Daoist philosophy, dark and light, yin and yang, arrive in the Tao Te Ching at chapter 42. It becomes sensible from an initial quiescence or emptiness (wuji, sometimes symbolized by an empty circle), and continues moving until quiescence is reached again. For instance, dropping a stone in a calm pool of water will simultaneously raise waves and lower troughs between them, and this alternation of high and low points in the water will radiate outward until the movement dissipates and the pool is calm once more. 

Yin and yang thus are always opposite and equal qualities. Whenever one quality reaches its peak, it will naturally begin to transform into the opposite quality: for example, grain that reaches its full height in summer (fully yang) will produce seeds and die back in winter (fully yin) in an endless cycle.

It is impossible to talk about yin or yang without some reference to the opposite, since yin and yang are bound together as parts of a mutual whole (for example, there cannot be the bottom of the foot without the top). A way to illustrate this idea is to postulate the notion of a race with only women or only men; this race would disappear in a single generation. Yet, women and men together create new generations that allow the race they mutually create (and mutually come from) to survive. The interaction of the two gives birth to things, like manhood. 

Yin and yang transform each other: like an undertow in the ocean, every advance is complemented by a retreat, and every rise transforms into a fall. Thus, a seed will sprout from the earth and grow upwards towards the skyan intrinsically yang movement. Then, when it reaches its full potential height, it will fall. The growth of the top seeks light, while roots grow in darkness. 

The cycles of the seasons and of plants that progresses or entropies depending on the season. In summer it seeks to procure healthier leaves, whittling (entropy) of the plant is in autumn, the degrown plants (destruction) is in winter, growth (creating) of the plant or tree during spring. Where it's gaining or progressing, fully progressed occurs during summer, summer seeks stability as it seeks to keep (progress) the leaves and branches that are healthy, growth and progress reaching its end point of a cycle. Creation as part of yang, and destruction as part of yin, progress on one side (yang) and entropy on the other side (yin), is represented in the cycles.

Certain catchphrases have been used to express yin and yang complementarity:
 The bigger the front, the bigger the back.
 Illness is the doorway to health.
 Tragedy turns to comedy.
 Disasters turn out to be blessings.

Modern usage

Yin is the black side, and yang is the white side. Other color arrangements have included the white of yang being replaced by red. The taijitu is sometimes accompanied by other shapes.

The relationship between yin and yang is often described in terms of sunlight playing over a mountain and a valley. Yin (literally the 'shady place' or 'north slope') is the dark area occluded by the mountain's bulk, while yang (literally the "sunny place' or "south slope") is the brightly lit portion. As the sun moves across the sky, yin and yang gradually trade places with each other, revealing what was obscured and obscuring what was revealed.

Yin is characterized as slow, soft, yielding, diffuse, cold, wet, and passive; and is associated with water, earth, the moon, negativity, femininity, shadows/darkness, destruction, and night time.

Yang, by contrast, is fast, hard, solid, focused, hot/warm, dry, and active; and is associated with fire, sky/air, the sun, positivity, masculinity, glowing/light, creation, and daytime.

Yin and yang also applies to the human body. In traditional Chinese medicine good health is directly related to the balance between yin and yang qualities within oneself.  If yin and yang become unbalanced, one of the qualities is considered deficient or has vacuity.

I Ching

In the I Ching, originally a divination manual of the Western Zhou period (c. 1000–750 BC) based on Chinese Astronomy, yin and yang are represented by broken and solid lines: yin is broken and yang is solid. These are then combined into trigrams, which are more yang (e.g. ) or more yin (e.g. ) depending on the number of broken and solid lines (e.g.,  is heavily yang, while  is heavily yin), and trigrams are combined into hexagrams (e.g.  and ). The relative positions and numbers of yin and yang lines within the trigrams determines the meaning of a trigram, and in hexagrams the upper trigram is considered yang with respect to the lower trigram, yin, which allows for complex depictions of interrelations.

Taijitu

The principle of yin and yang is represented by the Taijitu (literally "Diagram of the Supreme Ultimate"). The term is commonly used to mean the simple "divided circle" form, but may refer to any of several schematic diagrams representing these principles, such as the swastika, common to Hinduism, Buddhism, and Jainism. Similar symbols have also appeared in other cultures, such as in Celtic art and Roman shield markings.

In this symbol the two teardrops swirl to represent the conversion of yin to yang and yang to yin. This is seen when a ball is thrown into the air with a yang velocity then converts to a yin velocity to fall back to earth. The two teardrops are opposite in direction to each other to show that as one increases the other decreases. The dot of the opposite field in the tear drop shows that there is always yin within yang and always yang within yin.

T'ai chi ch'uan 

T'ai chi ch'uan or Taijiquan, a form of martial art, is often described as the principles of yin and yang applied to the human body and an animal body. Wu Jianquan, a famous Chinese martial arts teacher, described Taijiquan as follows:

See also

 Dualistic cosmology
 Shatkona
 Dialectic
 Ayin and Yesh
 Enantiodromia
 Flag of Mongolia
 Flag of South Korea
 Flag of Tibet
 Fu Xi
 Gankyil
 Huangdi Neijing
 Ometeotl
 Onmyōdō
 T'ai chi ch'uan
 Taegeuk
 Tomoe
 Zhuangzi

References

Footnotes

Works cited

External links

 
 Yin Yang meaning in Chinese educational video.
 Yin and Yang, goldenelixir.com
 "Precelestial and Postcelestial Yin and Yang", by Liu Yiming (1734–1821)

Chinese martial arts terminology
Chinese philosophy
Chinese words and phrases
Dichotomies
Dualism in cosmology
Religious symbols
Symbols
Tai chi
Taoist cosmology
Traditional Chinese medicine